Bam 6.6 is a documentary about the 2003 Bam earthquake in Iran. The film, subtitled "Humanity has no Borders", was produced and directed by Jahangir Golestanparast.

The film documents the plight of American tourists Tobb Dell'Oro and his Jewish fiancée, Adele Freedman, after they are buried under the quake's rubble. Particular attention is paid to the ways in which grief-stricken Iranians make efforts to treat the couple's injuries and comfort Adele afterwards. The film's format combines footage of the earthquake with interviews of survivors and people who coordinated humanitarian efforts.

Release
Bam 6.6 premiered at the United Nations Association Film Festival in October 2007, nearly four years after the earthquake struck. An updated release includes supplemental footage and additional interviews with witnesses, victims, and aid workers.

Awards 
 Winner, Best Story at the 2008 Noor Iranian Film Festival
 Winner, Best Documentary at the 2008 Noor Iranian Film Festival
 Winner, Best Director at the 2008 Noor Iranian Film Festival

See also 
Voices of Bam
United States-Iran relations
History of the Jews in Iran

References

External links 
 Official website of Bam 6.6
 Interview with Jahangir Golestanparast

Iranian documentary films
Documentary films about earthquakes
2003 films
2003 documentary films